Henry is an English male given name and an Irish and French surname, borrowed from Old French, originally of Germanic origin (Haimirich) from the elements haim ("home") and ric ("powerful"). Equivalents in other languages are Anraí (Irish), Eanruig (Scots Gaelic), Enrico, Amerigo (Italian), Enrique (Spanish), Heinrich (German), Henning (Swedish), Henri (Modern French), Henrik (Hungarian and Scandinavian), Henrique (Portuguese), Henryk (Polish), (H)enric (Occitan surname), Hendrik (Dutch), and Genrikh (Russian), among others.

Arts
Big Boy Henry (1921–2004), American Piedmont blues guitarist, singer and songwriter
Buck Henry (1930–2020), American actor and screenwriter
Chad Henry (born 1946), American musical theatre composer
Charles Henry (librarian) (1859–1926), French librarian and editor
Clarence "Frogman" Henry (born 1937), American rhythm and blues singer
David Eugene Henry (born 1946), American painter and sculptor 
Dorothy Henry (1925–2020), American artist and cartoonist 
Edward Lamson Henry (1841–1919), American genre painter  
François-Louis Henry (1786–1855), French opera singer
George Henry (painter) (1858–1943), Scottish painter (1880s to 1910s)
Gloria Henry (1923–2021), American actress
Jim Henry (singer) (born 1964), bass singer in barbershop quartets
Katie Henry, American blues rock singer, guitarist, pianist and songwriter
Lenny Henry (born 1958), British comedian
Michel Henry (1922–2002), French continental philosopher
Mike Henry, (born 1964), American writer, producer, voice actor, and comedian
O. Henry [pen name] (1862–1910), American writer
Pierre Henry (born 1927), French composer
Robert Henri (1865–1929), American painter
Teuira Henry (1847–1915), Tahitian ethnologist
Victor Henry (1850–1907), French philologist

Clergy
Caleb Sprague Henry (1804–1884), American clergyman
Carl F. H. Henry (1913–2003), American theologian
Harold William Henry (1909–1976), American-born Catholic archbishop in South Korea
Matthew Henry (1662–1714), English divine
Philip Henry (clergyman) (1631–1696), English clergyman

Inventors and scientists
Benjamin Tyler Henry (1821–1898), American inventor of the Henry rifle 
Beulah Louise Henry (1887–1973), American inventor; nicknamed "Lady Edison"  
Etienne Ossian Henry (1798–1873), French chemist 
George Morrison Reid Henry (1891–1983), entomologist and ornithologist 
Joseph Henry (1797–1878), American physicist
Paul Henry and Prosper Henry (1848–1905), French astronomers
Warren Elliot Henry (1909–2001), American physicist

Journalism
 Alan Henry, Lifehacker staff writer

Politics
Albert Henry (politician) (1907–81), Premier of the Cook Islands
Alexander Henry (Philadelphia) (1823-1883), mayor of Philadelphia
Brad Henry (born 1963), Governor of Oklahoma
Cameron Henry (born 1974), Louisiana politician
Daniel Maynadier Henry (1823–1899), U.S. Representative from Maryland
Douglas Henry (1926–2017), American politician
Edward Stevens Henry (1836–1921), American politician
Émile Henry (anarchist) (1872–1894), French anarchist
Geoffrey Henry, (1940–2012), Premier of the Cook Islands
George Stewart Henry, (1871–1958) Canadian politician
Hubert-Joseph Henry, French soldier involved in the Dreyfus Affair
Joyce Henry, American politician
Patrick Henry (1736–1799), American politician  
Robert Harlan Henry (born 1953), American judge and Oklahoma politician, on the United States Court of Appeals for the Tenth Circuit 
Robert L. Henry (1864–1931), American politician  
Stuart Henry (born 1946), Australian politician

Sports
Alan Henry, British motorsports journalist
Beau Henry, Australian rugby league footballer
Bernard Henry (born 1960), American football player
Camille Henry, Canadian ice hockey player
Chris Henry (wide receiver) (1983–2009), American football player
Clarence Henry (boxer) (1926–1999), 1950s leading heavyweight American boxer
Derrick Henry (born 1994), American football player
Frank Henry (cricketer) (dates unknown), cricketer
Gordon Henry (footballer) (1930–2007), Scottish footballer
Graham Henry (born 1946), New Zealand rugby union coach
Hunter Henry (born 1994), American football player
Jim Henry (equestrian) (born 1947), Canadian Olympic equestrian
John Henry (catcher) (1889–1941), American baseball player
K. J. Henry (born 1999), American football player
Malik Henry (born 1998), American football player
Mark Henry (born 1971), American professional wrestler  
Matt Henry (cricketer) (born 1991), New Zealand cricketer
Mike Henry, (1936–2021), American football player and actor
Mitchell Henry (American football) (1992–2017), American football player
Neil Henry, Australian rugby league football coach
Payton Henry (born 1997), American baseball player
Robert Henry (bowls), New Zealand lawn bowler
Sek Henry (born 1987), American-Jamaican professional basketball player, 2018 Israeli Basketball Premier League MVP
Thierry Henry (born 1977), French footballer
Tommy Henry (American football) (born 1969), American football player
Tommy Henry (baseball) (born 1997), American baseball player
Travis Henry (born 1978), American football player
Triston Henry (born 1993), Canadian soccer player
Xavier Henry (born 1991), American basketball player

Other
Edward Henry (1850–1931), London police commissioner
Philip Henry, 4th and 5th Earl Stanhope
Robert Henry (1718–1790), Scottish historian and minister 
Robert L. Henry Jr. (1882–?), American professor of law
Ken Henry (public servant), Australian economist
Robert Selph Henry (1889–1970), American lawyer, railroad executive and historian
S. M. I. Henry (1839–1900), American evangelist, temperance reformer, poet, author
Bonnie Henry (1965- ), Canadian physician, Provincial Health Officer for British Columbia

Disambiguation
Alexander Henry (disambiguation) several people
Charles Henry (disambiguation), several people
David Henry (disambiguation), several people
Frederick Henry (disambiguation), several people
Jim Henry (disambiguation), several people
John Henry (disambiguation), several people and a renowned Thoroughbred racehorse
Marcus Henry (disambiguation), multiple people
Paul Henry (disambiguation), several people 
William Henry (disambiguation), several people

See also 

 Hendric
 Hendrick (disambiguation)
 Hendricks (disambiguation)
 Hendrickx
 Hendrik (disambiguation)
 Hendriks
 Hendrikx
 Hendrix (disambiguation)
 Hendryx
 Henri
 Henrik
 Henryk (given name)

Henry family of New Zealand

References

External links 

English-language surnames
Surnames of French origin
Surnames of English origin
Patronymic surnames
Surnames from given names